East Hardy High School is a high school located in Baker, West Virginia. It was established in the late 1970s after the consolidation of two K-12 schools in Eastern Hardy County: Mathias School and Wardensville School. The school's mascot is the Cougar. The school was listed in the U.S. News & World Report top high schools in the United States every year from 2008 to 2012.

See also 
 Hardy County Schools
East Hardy started as a Vo-tech school that was built in the early 1970s.  It did not become a high school until 1979 when Mathias High School and Wardensville High School consolidated. It was recognized as a WV school of excellence and has met AYP the last couple years.

References

External links 
 School website

Educational institutions established in the 1970s
Schools in Hardy County, West Virginia
Public high schools in West Virginia